Do Aur Do Paanch (Hindi: दो और दो पांच, Bengali: দুই আর দুই পাঁচ, English: Two and two make five) is a 1980 Hindi action comedy movie produced by Devar films and directed by Rakesh Kumar. The film stars Shashi Kapoor, Amitabh Bachchan, Hema Malini & Parveen Babi. The film was remade in Tamil as Ranga (1982) starring Rajinikanth.

Plot
Vijay (Amitabh Bachchan) and Sunil (Shashi Kapoor) are petty burglars. They don't go well with each other and are sworn enemies. Their respective bosses command them to go to a school where their task is to abduct a rich man Seth Mathur's (Shreeram Lagoo) son, Bittoo and bring him in so as to demand a huge ransom. Vijay and Sunil fake their identities and join the school as Ram and Lakshman, respectively. Ram is appointed as a P.E. instructor while Lakshman is made the music teacher. On their journey towards the task, Ram meets Anju (Parveen Babi) the principal's daughter while Lakshman meets Shalu (Hema Malini) the dance teacher.  Both the ladies, unaware of their background and motive, fall in love.

Vijay and Sunil get close to Bittoo so as to lure him but as days pass by, both of them realize their true affection for that boy and drop their plan of abducting him. Meanwhile, Anju and Shalu come to know of their lovers' true identity and by their word of love and affection change them for good. Sunil's boss Uncle Jagdish (Kader Khan) loses hope on him and he himself comes up with a plan and abducts the boy. Vijay and Sunil join hands to save the boy from Uncle Jagdish and rescue him with Uncle Jagdish and his henchmen being arrested by the police eventually.

Cast

Shashi Kapoor as Sunil/Lakshman
Amitabh Bachchan as Vijay/Ram
Hema Malini as Shalu
Parveen Babi as Anju Sharma
Sajjan as Principal Om Prakash Sharma
Shreeram Lagoo as Seth Mathur
Kader Khan as Uncle Jagdish
Om Prakash as Prisoner (Guest appearance)
Yunus Parvez as a Real Music teacher
Lalita Pawar as Sunil's mother
Mohan Sherry as a Security guard
Ram Sethi as Pyarelal
Goga Kapoor as Jagdish Goon, who plays the role of Lion in Stage during the Song  Prem Se Humko jeene do
Gurbachan Singh as Railway Engine Driver (Uncredited Role)

Production
The film's intro was a cartoon sketch, with Amitabh Bachchan and Shashi Kapoor characters trying to steal and was very fondly received by viewers.

Film is fondly remembered for the comedy scenes between the main two stars .

Soundtrack

The sound track did really well for this movie. 
All songs were composed by Rajesh Roshan and penned by Anjaan.

External links 
 

1980 films
Films scored by Rajesh Roshan
1980s Hindi-language films
Hindi films remade in other languages